This is a round-up of the 1990 Sligo Intermediate Football Championship. Easkey were Champions for the third time in this year, after defeating Calry/St. Joseph's in the final.

First round

Quarter finals

Semi-finals

Sligo Intermediate Football Championship Final

Sligo Intermediate Football Championship
Sligo Intermediate Football Championship